William Keith was a Scottish amateur footballer who played as an inside right in the Scottish League for Queen's Park.

Personal life 
Keith served as a sergeant in the Argyll and Sutherland Highlanders during the First World War.

Career statistics

References

Year of birth missing
Scottish footballers
Scottish Football League players
British Army personnel of World War I
Association football inside forwards
Queen's Park F.C. players
Argyll and Sutherland Highlanders soldiers
Place of death missing